Roberto Javier Ordóñez Ayoví (born May 4, 1985) is a professional Ecuadorian footballer who currently plays for S.D. Aucas.

International career
Ordóñez made his debut for Ecuador on October 5, 2017 against Chile.

References

1985 births
Living people
People from Guayaquil
Ecuadorian footballers
Ecuador international footballers
Ecuadorian Serie A players
Manta F.C. footballers
L.D.U. Loja footballers
C.D. Técnico Universitario footballers
S.D. Aucas footballers
Guayaquil City F.C. footballers
Mushuc Runa S.C. footballers
Fuerza Amarilla S.C. footballers
Delfín S.C. footballers
C.S. Emelec footballers
Association football forwards